Raquel Olmedo (born Siomara Anicia Orama Leal on 30 December 1937) is a Cuban-born Mexican actress and singer. She started her career in her native Cuba before moving to Mexico in 1959. She performed in the last years of the Golden Age of Mexican cinema.

Biography 
Olmedo was born in Caibarién, Las Villas, Cuba, and began her career there in theatre singing opera. In the wake of the 1959 Cuban revolution, Olmedo came to Mexico in 1959 as an unknown artist. She did a little work in the movie business before finally landing a small role in the telenovela La sombra del otro in 1963.

Following a starring role in the 1975 telenovela Lo Imperdonable, Olmedo got a record deal with CBS Records and released her first album, Mitad Mujer, Mitad Gaviota. Her career as a singer proved initially successful, with the title track from this record (written by Lolita De La Colina) becoming a radio hit. She toured throughout all Latin America in the coming years while continuing her television and film work. In the coming years, she released a total of five albums, her last being the ranchera album Mañana Ya Ni Vengas in 1983, produced by ranchera song arranger Pedro Ramirez, best known for his work with Javier Solís and Vicente Fernández.

Her most recent role on the television series Barrera de amor proved to be one of her most successful roles. This was also one of the first times she played a villain.

For her work in television, Olmedo was inducted into the Paseo de las Luminarias in 1984.

Albums 
 Mitad Mujer, Mitad Gaviota (1977)
 Tu, Siempre Tu (1979)
 No Señora (1980)
 La Fuerza De Una Voz Que Impone El Cambio (1982)
 Mañana Ya Ni Vengas (1983)
 Con el Alma en Cueros (2009)

Filmography

Film

Television 

|2018 Amar sin Ley

Awards and nominations

TVyNovelas Awards

References

External links 
 
 [ Allmusic.com entry on Raquel Olmedo's "Mañana Ya Ni Vengas" album]
 

1937 births
Living people
Mexican telenovela actresses
Mexican television actresses
Mexican film actresses
Mexican stage actresses
Mexican voice actresses
Mexican women singers
20th-century Mexican actresses
21st-century Mexican actresses
Cuban people of Spanish descent
Cuban emigrants to Mexico
People from Caibarién